The historic or historical episcopate comprises all episcopates, that is, it is the collective body of all the bishops of a church who are in valid apostolic succession. This succession is transmitted from each bishop to their successors by the rite of Holy Orders. It is sometimes subject of episcopal genealogy.

Line of succession 

In the churches that have well-documented ties to the history of Christianity as a whole, it is held that only a person in apostolic succession, a line of succession of bishops dating back to the Apostles, can be a valid bishop; can validly ordain priests, deacons and bishops; and can validly celebrate the sacraments of the church. These churches are the Roman Catholic Church, the Eastern Orthodox Church, the Eastern Rite Catholic Church, the Oriental Orthodox Church, the Church of Sweden, the Church of Denmark (Lutheran), the Evangelical Lutheran Church of Finland, the Old Catholic Church, the Moravian Church, the Independent Catholic Churches, the Anglican Communion, and the Assyrian Church of the East.

Bishops of the Evangelical Lutheran Church in America lay claim to the apostolic succession through the laying on of hands by Lutheran bishops in the historic episcopate, with bishops from the Moravian Church and Episcopal Church being present too as the full communion agreement came into fruition at that time. Some theologians, such as R.J. Cooke, have argued that the Methodist Church is also within the historic episcopate, being "in direct succession to the apostles through the bishops and patriarchs of the Eastern Church." An Anglican-Methodist Covenant stated that 

The Eastern Orthodox Church's view has been summarised, "While accepting the canonical possibility of recognising the existence (υποστατόν) of sacraments performed outside herself, (the Eastern Orthodox Church) questions their validity (έγκυρον) and certainly rejects their efficacy (ενεργόν)"; and it sees "the canonical recognition (αναγνώρισις) of the validity of sacraments performed outside the Orthodox Church (as referring) to the validity of the sacraments only of those who join the Orthodox Church (individually or as a body)."

In 1922 the Eastern Orthodox Ecumenical Patriarch of Constantinople recognised Anglican orders as valid, holding that they carry "the same validity as the Roman, Old Catholic and Armenian Churches possess". In the encyclical "From the Oecumenical Patriarch to the Presidents of the Particular Eastern Orthodox Churches", Meletius IV of Constantinople, the Oecumenical Patriarch, wrote: "That the Orthodox theologians who have scientifically examined the question have almost unanimously come to the same conclusions and have declared themselves as accepting the validity of Anglican Orders." Following this declaration, in 1923, the Eastern Orthodox Patriarchate of Jerusalem, as well as the Eastern Orthodox Church of Cyprus agreed by "provisionally acceding that Anglican priests should not be re-ordained if they became Orthodox"; in 1936, the Romanian Orthodox Church "endorsed Anglican Orders". Historically, some Eastern Orthodox bishops have assisted in the consecration of Anglican bishops; for example, in 1870, the Most Reverend Alexander Lycurgus, the Greek Orthodox Archbishop of Syra and Tinos, was one of the bishops who consecrated Henry MacKenzie as the Suffragan Bishop of Nottingham.

Because of changes in the Ordinal (the rites of Holy Orders) under King Edward VI, the Roman Catholic Church does not recognize all Anglican holy orders as valid.

Anglican views 

In the sixteenth century a solid body of Anglican opinion emerged which saw the theological importance of the historic episcopate but refused to 'unchurch' those churches which did not retain it.  The preface to the Ordinal limits itself to stating historical reasons why episcopal orders are to 'be continued and reverently used in the Church of England'.  Before 1662 it was assumed that the foreign Reformed (Presbyterian) Churches were genuine ones with an authentic ministry of Word and Sacrament.  The 1662 Act of Uniformity formally excluded from pastoral office in England any who lacked episcopal ordination but this was a reaction against the abolition of episcopacy in the Commonwealth period.

As the divergences between the theory of 'the godly prince' and the practices of monarchs like James II, William III and the early Georges became more obvious, Pearson and Beveridge saw the "Apostolical Office" of the bishop as a guarantee of the Church's identity and this formed the background to the vital emphasis placed on it by Newman and the other Tractarians, through whom it passed into Anglo-Catholic thought.

The modern debate divides three ways: between those who see the "historic episcopate" to be constitutive of the Church (of the esse); those who hold it is a question of its "well-being"(bene esse); and those who consider that it is necessary for the Church to be fully itself (plene esse). The Chicago-Lambeth Quadrilateral includes the "historic episcopate" as "essential to the visible unity of the church", but allows for its being adapted locally in its working to the varying needs of those who God calls into the unity of the Church. However, this has not meant a general commitment to the idea that in its absence there is no Church.

See also 
 Episcopal polity
 Apostolicae curae
 Annual conference of the United Methodist Church
 Episcopi vagantes
 Canon law (Catholic Church)
 Jurisprudence of Catholic canon law
 Catholic Apostolic Lineage

Notes and references

Notes

References

Bibliography

 
 
 
 
 
 
 

Types of Christian organization
Christian terminology